Toreulia acanthina is a species of moth of the family Tortricidae. It is found in Napo Province, Ecuador.

The wingspan is 17–25 mm. The ground colour of the forewings is brownish cinnamon, the basal area is suffused with brown and blackish and some orange-rust suffusions before the middle of the wing and along the costa. The hindwings are brownish white, suffused with brownish.

Etymology
The species name refers to the presence of thorns of the sacculus and is derived from Greek akantha (meaning a thorn).

References

Moths described in 2007
Euliini